The Red Poster (German: Das rote Plakat) is a 1920 German silent crime film directed by Emil Justitz.

Cast
In alphabetical order
 Claire Creutz
 Emmy Denner as Gräfin Rhoden 
 André Haase as André Delmont 
 Ernst Hofmann as Blasser Kavalier 
 Tatjana Irrah as Marion Diabelli 
 Hans Lanser-Ludolff as Kripo 
 Georg Leux 
 Adolf E. Licho as Emil Storch
 Oskar Linke
 Kurt Middendorf as Baron Dürenstein 
 Ida Perry as Frau Bauer 
 Georg H. Schnell as Kommissar Herder 
 C.W. Tetting
 Herr Wettmann
 Heinrich Wild

References

Bibliography
 Rolf Giesen. The Nosferatu Story: The Seminal Horror Film, Its Predecessors and Its Enduring Legacy. McFarland, 2019.

External links

1920 films
Films of the Weimar Republic
Films directed by Emil Justitz
German silent feature films